Bishop Potter may refer to:
Bishop Henry Codman Potter (1835–1908) of the Episcopal Church in the Diocese of New York
Bishop Alonzo Potter (1800–1865) of the Episcopal Church in the Diocese of Pennsylvania
Bishop Horatio Potter (1802–1887) of the Episcopal Church in the Diocese of New York